The 1923 New Mexico A&M Aggies football team was an American football team that represented New Mexico College of Agriculture and Mechanical Arts (now known as New Mexico State University) during the 1923 college football season.  In their first year under head coach R. R. Brown, the Aggies compiled a 9–0 record, shut out five opponents, and outscored all opponents by a total of 218 to 17. The team played its home games on Miller Field, sometimes also referred to as College Field.

Schedule

References

New Mexico AandM
New Mexico State Aggies football seasons
College football undefeated seasons
New Mexico AandM Aggies football